Yevhen Mykolayovych Nyshchuk is Ukrainian theater and cinema actor, Merited Artist of Ukraine and a former Minister of Culture of Ukraine. He held the post from February to December 2014, and again from April 2016 to August 2019.

Biography 
Born 29 December 1972 in Ivano-Frankivsk.

In 1995, he graduated from National University of Theatre, Film and TV in Kyiv (Workshop of National Artist of Ukraine Valentina Zymnya).

He attended the Actor Kyiv academic workshop of theater art "Constellation".

Nyshchuk was Minister of Culture of Ukraine in the 2014 Yatsenyuk Government from 27 February 2014 till 2 December 2014. In the 2 December 2014 appointed second Yatsenyuk Government, he did not return. Nyshchuk also did not participate in the 2014 Ukrainian parliamentary election. From 14 April 2016 until 29 August 2019 he was again Minister of Culture.

Nyshchuk took part in the July 2019 Ukrainian parliamentary election with the party Ukrainian Strategy. But this party did not win, any seats in the election.

Public and political active 
In addition to success in theater and cinema, Yevhen is a constant leading artistic events held at the Kyiv Academic Workshop of Theater Art "Constellation" and initiator-leading many festivals, concerts, state events with the participation of the first persons of the state.

Yevhen Nischuk, together with the first persons of the state, represented Ukraine in the days of culture of Ukraine in Georgia, Azerbaijan, Kazakhstan, Germany, Poland and others.

The actor contributed to the international recognition by the countries of the Holodomor in Ukraine as a crime in front of mankind, traveling with the artistic project "Panahid by the Holodomor" by Europe - Israel, Holland, Great Britain, Czech Republic, Slovakia, Poland, France, for which was awarded thanks to the President and the Ministry of Culture and Tourism of Ukraine.

On April 14, 2016, the Verkhovna Rada of Ukraine appointed a new Cabinet of Ministers of Ukraine (Groysman's government), with Yevhen Nyshchuk as the Minister of Culture of Ukraine.

Maidan 2004 and 2013-2014 
During the Orange Revolution, he was known as the "voice of Maidan." He became a moderator on the stage of EuroMaidan 2013–2014, invited by Yuriy Lutsenko. He had not participated in any rallies in the previous nine years, despite previous invitations.

Russian invasion of Ukraine
During the 2022 Russian invasion of Ukraine, Nyshchuk served in the Armed Forces of Ukraine, stationed in the area around Kyiv.

References

External links 
 Biography

1972 births
Actors from Ivano-Frankivsk
Living people
Kyiv National I. K. Karpenko-Kary Theatre, Cinema and Television University alumni
Ukrainian male stage actors
Recipients of the title of Merited Artist of Ukraine
People of the Orange Revolution
People of the Euromaidan
Culture ministers of Ukraine
Ukrainian male film actors